Odd Emil Ingebrigtsen (born 8 October 1964) is a Norwegian politician for the Conservative Party. He served as Minister of Fisheries from 2020 to 2021.

Personal life
He is married to Grete Bang Ingebrigtsen.

Political career

Youth wing
From 1986 to 1988 he was the secretary general of the Young Conservatives (Unge Høyre), the youth wing of the Conservative Party.

Local politics
On the local level he was a member of Bodø city council from 1988 to 2007, and chaired the local party chapter from 1985 to 1987. He also chaired the local chapter in an acting capacity between July and October 1991. 

On 29 June 2022, he was announced as the Bodø Conservatives' mayoral candidate in the upcoming 2023 local elections.

Parliament
He served as a deputy representative to the Storting from Nordland from 1989 to 1993.

Minister of Fisheries
On 13 March 2020, he was appointed minister of fisheries following the resignation of Geir-Inge Sivertsen.

In December, he encouraged Norwegians who no longer had a job to take part in the winter fishing season, saying: "It will be fatal to stop production and operations in the middle of such a peak season. We hope that some of the need for labor can be solved by unemployed Norwegians getting jobs in Lofoten and Vesterålen now in the peak season".

In February 2021, Ingebrigtsen denied that young people would face difficult challenges in becoming fishers. He compared the challenges to the same ones faced when they're looking for a place to live, and asserted that it wasn't a given right to become a fisher. He also praised the young people for their engagement on the issue. His response came following criticism given by twenty year old young fisher who stated that one had to have a lot of money in to become a fisher.

In July, he asserted that Norway would respond harshly if the European Union would go against the salmon quotas established in the area around Svalbard. He also stated that it would be irrelevant for the EU or any other country to determine the said quotas. 

Five days before his departure, Ingebrigtsen sent a letter out to shipowners urging them to take action against sexual harassment on board fishing vessels. He also encouraged his successor to follow up on the issue. He also expressed that it appeared that the fisheries branch would be facing its own MeToo, saying: "It is important that we now have the floodlight on, so that the troll appears in the light and eventually cracks. It may seem that the fishing industry here may get its "meeto"".

References

External links

Norwegian Wikipedia

1964 births
Living people
Deputy members of the Storting
Conservative Party (Norway) politicians
Nordland politicians
Politicians from Bodø
Government ministers of Norway